Amos "Moody" Allison was an American baseball second baseman in the Negro leagues. He played with the Indianapolis ABCs in 1925.

References

External links
 and Baseball-Reference Black Baseball Stats and  Seamheads 

Indianapolis ABCs players
Year of birth missing
Year of death missing
Baseball second basemen